Hans Swansee (27 January 1902 – 13 July 1959) was a Swiss artist. His work was part of the art competition at the 1932 Summer Olympics.

References

1902 births
1959 deaths
Swiss artists
Olympic competitors in art competitions
Artists from Zürich